Ada Baillie Good or Mrs T. D. Good (1880-1958) was an Irish badminton player.

Biography
Ada Good was born Ada Baillee Carroll. Good, alongside her future husband T. D. Good, took part in the first international badminton match to be played in Ireland in 1903 at the Irish Open as Miss Carroll. She played her last international match in 1929.

In 1953, Good, her husband, Sir George Thomas, and Leonard Ransford attended a Golden Jubilee lunch held by the Badminton Union of Ireland, as the only four surviving players from the 1903 international matches. They had four children, three of whom also played badminton at national and international level, Derreen, Barbara, and Norman.

References

1880 births
1958 deaths
Irish female badminton players